Gary Vey was a Canadian politician, who sat in the Newfoundland House of Assembly from 1995 to 1996 as a member of the Liberals. He represented the electoral district of Gander.

References

Liberal Party of Newfoundland and Labrador MHAs
Living people
Year of birth missing (living people)